Audra The Rapper is an American rapper, songwriter, and television personality. She is a cast member on the third season of Oxygen Network's hit series 'Sisterhood of Hiphop' executive produced by T.I. Audra started writing music at the age of six years old and recording herself at age thirteen in her mother's closet. She released her first mixtape, Sweet and Sour Vol. I at age 16 and sold it at local malls and car washes. Audra has released 5 studio projects including her most recent, 'Anti Love Songs' which she released under her own label alongside Sony Music's RED Distribution.

Early years 

Audra was born in Washington, DC and raised in Richmond, Virginia by her single-mother and grandmother. Audra has said music was a great inspiration to her, especially when it comes to Jazz and RnB. Listening to her grandmother spin Anita Baker, Louis Armstrong and Ella Fitzgerald made singing an early priority for her. Audra was raised in the church and joined the choir at age 5 and was leading solos by age 6. Audra says she was 6 years old when she got her first CD, Brandy Norwood's (aka Brandy) self-titled debut album and it fixed her attention on having a music career. Audra has stated that her major musical influences are Lauryn Hill, The Diplomats, Kanye West, and Floetry.

Music 

In the summer of 2009, Audra The Rapper and Rick Ross crossed paths when by chance they were both at iPower 92.1 radio station in Audra's hometown of Richmond, VA.  The two met a second time in October 2010 at a university homecoming concert in Richmond where Audra opened for Ross and her performance lead Ross to endorse, mentor, and co-sign her.

Audra The Rapper on numerous occasions has said how Lauryn Hill is her all time inspiration, so much so that Audra's 2010 mixtape, Miseducation of Audra was a tribute to Lauryn.

Unlike a lot of rappers, whose rap style have easily been categorized as Trap, Hardcore or Conscious, Audra The Rapper has partnered her lyrics with a variety of sounds, reflecting various styles and has described her style is "Ratchet Soul".

Discography

Songs 
 2011   "Love Song Remix" ft Mickey Factz and Raheem DeVaughn
 2013   "Hit and Run" ft Abir
 2015 "China.Bus"
 2016 "Done.Did"
 2016 "Sometimes"
 2016 "Bxtchlxss"

Mixtapes 

 2007   Sweet and Sour
 2010   Miseducation of Audra
 2011   No Such Thing Does Exist

EPs 

 2015 Retrospectrum

Albums 

 2016 Anti Love Songs

Videos 

 2014 "Nutter Butters"
 2015  No.Body
 2016  Sometimes

Honors and awards

References

External links
 

1989 births
American women rappers
African-American women rappers
American hip hop singers
African-American women singer-songwriters
Living people
Old Dominion University alumni
Musicians from Richmond, Virginia
Musicians from Virginia Beach, Virginia
Rappers from Washington, D.C.
Singer-songwriters from Virginia
21st-century American rappers
21st-century American women musicians
Date of birth missing (living people)
21st-century African-American women
21st-century African-American musicians
20th-century African-American people
20th-century African-American women
Singer-songwriters from Washington, D.C.
21st-century women rappers